Klaipėda "Varpas" gymnasium (Lithuanian: Klaipėdos „Varpo“ gimnazija) is a Lithuanian language gymnasium school located in Bandužiai neighborhood, Klaipėda, Lithuania. It was founded in 1989. The school is being accredited. As of 2007, "Varpas" gymnasium has 68 schoolteachers, including 1 teacher expert and 20 supervisors.

References
 Official website

Educational institutions established in 1989
Schools in Klaipėda
1989 establishments in Lithuania